Maheepala Herath is a Sri Lankan politician. The current Governor of the North Central Province, he was the former Chief Minister of Sabaragamuwa Province of Sri Lanka. He belongs to the Sri Lanka Freedom Party and part of the United People's Freedom Alliance.

References

Sri Lankan Buddhists
Governors of North Central Province, Sri Lanka
Chief Ministers of Sabaragamuwa Province
Members of the Sabaragamuwa Provincial Council
Living people
Sri Lanka Freedom Party politicians
United People's Freedom Alliance politicians
Sinhalese politicians
Year of birth missing (living people)